The following is a list of the 66 municipalities (comuni) of the Province of Sassari, Sardinia, Italy.

List

See also 
List of municipalities of Italy

References 

Sassari